The Jilintai I Dam is a concrete-face rock-fill embankment dam on the Kash River,  east of Nilka in Xinjiang, China. The dam was constructed between 2001 and 2005 for several purposes but mainly hydroelectric power generation. It supports a 460 MW power station. The Jilintai I is the first of 10 dam projects on the Kash. Construction of Jilintai II, directly downstream, began in May 2008 and the 50 MW power station was commissioned in October 2010. The project, including the diversion dam, was completed in April 2011.

See also

List of major power stations in Xinjiang

References

Dams in China
Concrete-face rock-fill dams
Hydroelectric power stations in Xinjiang
Dams completed in 2005